The Itararé River is a river on the boundary between the Paraná and São Paulo states in southeastern Brazil.

See also
List of rivers of Paraná
List of rivers of São Paulo

References
Brazilian Ministry of Transport

Rivers of Paraná (state)
Rivers of São Paulo (state)